Flatcap Point is the most northerly of two relatively low flat-topped rock cliffs on the east side of the northern arm of Rohss Bay, James Ross Island. It was mapped from surveys by the Falkland Islands Dependencies Survey (1960–61); the descriptive name was given by the UK Antarctic Place-Names Committee.

References 

Headlands of James Ross Island